Stadion SK Prosek is a stadium in Prague, Czech Republic. It is currently used mostly for football matches.

History
When FK Bohemians Prague played in the Czech First League between 2008 and 2010, the ground was not used for league matches, with the club using FK Viktoria Stadion and Stadion Evžena Rošického instead. The club only used the stadium for training. Before the club's promotion to the Czech First League in 2008, the club had played in Horní Počernice. The club moved to the stadium in Střížkov in time for the 2011–12 season, in which they played in the 2. Liga.

Transport
The ground is around 15 minutes' walk from the Střížkov metro station.

References

External links 
 Stadium profile at vysledky.cz
 Photo gallery and data at Erlebnis-stadion.de

Football venues in Prague